Bucculatrix iranica is a moth of the family Bucculatricidae. It was described by G. Deschka in 1981 and is found in Iran.

The length of the forewings is about 4.8 mm. The ground colour of the forewings is whitish, sprinkled with ochreous. The hindwings are light grey with a satin hue.

References

Bucculatricidae
Moths described in 1981
Moths of Asia